Hemihyperplasia–multiple lipomatosis syndrome is a cutaneous condition characterized by multiple lipomas in association with asymmetric (but non-progressive and non-distorting) overgrowth, cutaneous capillary malformations, and thickened plantar skin with prominent creases.

See also 
 Involutional lipoatrophy
 List of cutaneous conditions

References 

Conditions of the subcutaneous fat
Syndromes